Princess Elisabeth, Duchess of Hohenberg (Elisabeth Hilda Zita Marie Anna Antonia Friederike Wilhelmine Luise; 22 December 1922 – 22 November 2011) was a Luxembourgian princess. She was a daughter of Grand Duchess Charlotte and her husband, Prince Felix of Bourbon-Parma, the sister of Grand Duke Jean and the aunt of Grand Duke Henri. In 1956 she married Franz, Duke of Hohenberg.

Biography
Princess Elisabeth was born at Berg Castle in Luxembourg on 22 December 1922 as the second child and first daughter of Grand Duchess Charlotte and Prince Felix. To commemorate her birth, Luxembourg issued a stamp as a souvenir sheet the following year, the world's first such miniature sheet.

Facing the German invasion in 10 May 1940 during World War II, the Grand Ducal Family of Luxembourg left the country to find refuge in Portugal, after receiving transit visas from the Portuguese consul Aristides de Sousa Mendes, in June 1940. They arrived at Vilar Formoso on 23 June 1940. After travelling through Coimbra and Lisbon, the family first stayed in Cascais, in Casa de Santa Maria, owned by Manuel Espírito Santo, who was then the honorary consul for Luxembourg in Portugal. By July they had moved to Monte Estoril, staying at the Chalet Posser de Andrade. On 10 July 1940, Princess Elisabeth, together with her father Prince Félix, her siblings, Heir Prince Jean, Princess Marie Adelaide, Princess Marie Gabriele, Prince Charles and Princess Alix, the nanny Justine Reinard and the chauffeur Eugène Niclou, along with his wife Joséphine, boarded the S.S. Trenton headed for New York City.

While Prince Félix and his children went to America, Grand Duchess Charlotte headed for London. Forced to respect American impartiality, the Grand Ducal Family settled for Montreal, Canada. With her father and brother Jean, Princess Elisabeth moved to London in 1942. With her sister Princess Marie Adelaide of Luxembourg, she attended Convent of the Sacred Heart in Roehampton, England. After the war ended, the Grand Ducal Family regained the grand duchy.

Marriage and issue
She married Franz, Duke of Hohenberg (1927–1977) in Luxembourg on 9 May 1956. He was a grandson of Archduke Franz Ferdinand of Austria, whose assassination in 1914 sparked World War I.

They had two daughters, Anita and Sophie, and seven grandchildren and seven great-grandchildren.
Anna (Anita) Charlotte Maximiliana Euphemia Maria Helena of Hohenberg (b. 18 August 1958, Schloss Berg, Luxembourg). Married Romee de la Poeze (b. 15 July 1949), on 22 July 1978 in Artstetten, Austria. They have four children:
Gaetan de la Poeze (b. 25 July 1980, Luxembourg)
Alix de la Poeze (b. 8 September 1981, Luxembourg) married Francois-Xavier Fraye (b. 7 March 1979) in 2010. They have four children:
Armel Fraye (b. 2011)
Benedikt Fraye (b. 2013)
Alexandra Fraye (b. 2014)
Marie-Anastasie Fraye (b. 2017)
Gabriel de la Poeze (b. 3 October 1987, Artstetten, Austria)
Raoul de la Poeze (b. 14 June 1989, Artstetten, Austria)
Sophie Felicitas Elisabetha Bona Maria Antonia (b. 10 May 1960, Schloss Berg, Luxembourg). Married Jean-Louis de Potesta (b. 8 February 1951) on 18 June 1983 in Artstetten, Austria. They have three children:
Eleonore de Potesta (b. 24 April 1984, Luxembourg). Married Diego Fernandez de Cordova y Cervero on 16 June 2012. They have three children:
Rafael Fernandez de Cordova y de Potesta (b. 9 August 2013)
Luis Fernandez de Cordova y de Potesta (b. 19 August 2016)
Sofia Fernandez de Cordova y de Potesta (b. 27 August 2018)
Baron Charles de Potesta (b. 25 October 1985, Luxembourg) 
Elizabeth de Potesta (b. 29 April 1988, London, England)

Final years
Princess Elisabeth returned to Luxembourg after her husband's death in 1977. In 1983 she inherited Artstetten Castle, which she ceded that year to her oldest daughter, Anita de La Poëze d´Harambure. Following the death of her mother Grand Duchess Charlotte, in 1985, she moved to Wasserhaf, near Fischbach Castle. Between 1980 and 1990, she participated in Luxembourgian official ceremonies. Towards the end of her life, she resided at Fischbach Castle with her older brother, Grand Duke Jean.

She died at Fischbach Castle on 22 November 2011 aged 88, following a stroke in 2010. She was cremated and buried next to her husband in a crypt at Artstetten Castle.

Ancestry

References

External links
 Grand-Ducal House of Luxembourg

1922 births
2011 deaths
House of Nassau-Weilburg
Hohenberg family
Luxembourgian princesses
Princesses of Bourbon-Parma
People from Colmar-Berg
People educated at Woldingham School
Disease-related deaths in Luxembourg
Daughters of monarchs